Queen's Park Juniors Football Club was a 19th-century football club based in Glasgow.

History

Despite the club's name, it was never formally part of the Queen's Park F.C. organization; the reserve clubs of Queen's Park were called the Strollers and the Hampden XI.  However, there were close links, as the Juniors played on the former ground of Queen's Park, enjoyed free entry to matches, and often provided players to Queen's Park.

The club gave its foundation date as 1870, although the earliest recorded match was a goalless draw against the Woodbank club in September 1873.

The club entered the Scottish Cup on three occasions in the late 1870s, but never progressed beyond the first round.  In 1875-76 the club scratched to Renton Thistle F.C., in 1876-77 the club lost 4–1 to eventual finalists Rangers, and in 1877-78 it lost to 1–0 away to Jordanhill.  The club seems to have stopped playing matches against other teams after this.

Colours

The club's colours were the same black and white as those of Queen's Park.

Grounds

The club played at the Recreation Park, near to Hampden Park.

Notable players

 George Ker, future Scottish international
 Stewart Lawrie, later President of Queen's Park

References

External links
RSSSF: Scottish Cup

Defunct football clubs in Scotland
Football clubs in Glasgow
Association football clubs established in 1870
Association football clubs disestablished in 1878
1870 establishments in Scotland
1878 disestablishments in Scotland